In computer-generated imagery and real-time 3D computer graphics, antiportal rendering is a way to reduce overdraw (the rendering of detail which will not be in the final image), and in this way to optimize draw speed. Antiportals are the inverse of portals.

An antiportal (or occluder) works by defining a plane or volume which can never be seen through, normally by placing it within an opaque object. The renderer uses this to quickly calculate which objects/faces/vertices lie behind the antiportal, and so are out of line of sight, so do not need to be rendered.

Many video games and 3D graphics programs use this technique for speed rendering. Unreal Tournament 2004, among many other games, uses this technique.

See also
 Portal rendering

References

Computer graphics
Unreal (video game series)